Adabraka is a town in the Korley Klottey Municipal Assembly, a Municipality of the Greater Accra Region of Ghana. It was the first and the most posh neighborhood in Ghana during the British era.

Education
Adabraka was once known for the O'Reilly Senior High School.  The school is a second cycle institution that relocated in 2010 to Okpoi Gonno at Teshie-Nungua.

The town hosts four tertiary institutions; the African University College of Communication (AUCC), The Ghana Institute of Languages(GIL), the Catholic Institute of Business and Technology(CIBT), and the University of Ghana Accra City Campus.

Healthcare
The Accra Psychiatry Hospital is located in Adabraka. Adabraka also has polyclinic called Adabraka Polyclinic, which is just opposite the Accra Psychiatry Hospital. 
The Accra Rehabilitation Centre is also located in Adabraka, along the Barnes Road.

Institution 

 Melcom

References

External links
 Adabraka - Google Map

Populated places in the Greater Accra Region